Andreas Žampa (born 13 August 1993) is a Slovakian alpine skier. He competed for Slovakia at the 2014, 2018 and 2022 Winter Olympics in the alpine skiing. His brother is Adam Žampa.

References

1993 births
Living people
Olympic alpine skiers of Slovakia
Alpine skiers at the 2014 Winter Olympics
Alpine skiers at the 2018 Winter Olympics
Alpine skiers at the 2022 Winter Olympics
Slovak male alpine skiers
People from Kežmarok
Sportspeople from the Prešov Region